Edward Humphrey may refer to:

 Edward Porter Humphrey (1809–1886), Presbyterian minister, orator and writer
 Edward William Cornelius Humphrey (1844–1917), his son, theological and legal scholar